McClure's or McClure's Magazine (1893–1929) was an American illustrated monthly periodical popular at the turn of the 20th century. The magazine is credited with having started the tradition of muckraking journalism (investigative, watchdog, or reform journalism), and helped direct the moral compass of the day.

The publishing company briefly got into the film business with McClure Pictures.

History
Founded by S. S. McClure (1857–1949) and John Sanborn Phillips (1861–1949), who had been classmates at Knox College, in June 1893. Phillips put up the $7,300 needed to launch the magazine. The magazine featured both political and literary content, publishing serialized novels-in-progress, a chapter at a time. In this way, McClure's published writers including Willa Cather, Arthur Conan Doyle, Herminie T. Kavanagh, Rudyard Kipling, Jack London, Lincoln Steffens, Robert Louis Stevenson, and Mark Twain.

At the beginning of the 20th century, its major competitors included Collier's and the Saturday Evening Post.

Examples of its work include Ida Tarbell's series in 1902 exposing the monopoly abuses of John D. Rockefeller's Standard Oil Company, and Ray Stannard Baker's earlier look at the United States Steel Corporation, which focused the public eye on the conduct of corporations. From January 1907 to June 1908, McClure's published the first detailed history of Christian Science and the story of its founder, Mary Baker Eddy (1821–1910) in 14 installments. The articles were later published in book form as The Life of Mary Baker G. Eddy and the History of Christian Science (1909).

In 1906 three staffers left to form The American Magazine. Shortly thereafter McClure's found itself in financial trouble, in part because a publishing plant the company was building for a cost of $105,000 ended up costing over three times that amount. Advertising revenue had also fallen. By 1911 S.S. McClure had lost control of the company, forced to sell the magazine to creditors. It was re-styled as a women's magazine and ran inconsistently in this format, with publication from October 1921 to February 1922, September 1924 and April 1925, and February to May 1926. The later issues, from July 1928 until March 1929, were published under the name New McClure's Magazine. The last issue was in March 1929, after which the magazine was taken over by The Smart Set. In 1916 the magazine published an Automobile Year Book (First McClure Automobile Year Book) with the specifications and pictures of over 100 different major producers of passenger and commercial vehicles.

McClure Pictures

Filmography
The Seven Deadly Sins (1917), a series
The Fighting Roosevelts, renamed Our Teddy after the death Teddy Roosevelt
Mother

Writers and editors

Staff
 Ray Stannard Baker
 Witter Bynner
 Willa Cather
 Burton J. Hendrick
 Will Irwin
 S. S. McClure
 Lincoln Steffens
 Mark Sullivan
 Ida Tarbell
 William Allen White
 Marion Hamilton Carter
 John Sanborn Phillips
 George Kibbe Turner

Other contributors
 J. M. Barrie
Stephen Crane
 Arthur Conan Doyle
 Herminie T. Kavanagh
 Rudyard Kipling
 Bruno Lessing
 Jack London
 Georgine Milmine
 Frank Norris
 Emmeline Pankhurst
 Marjorie Pickthall (1900s–1910s)
 Frank Crane (1861-1928), Presbyterian minister, speaker, and columnist 
 Robert Louis Stevenson 
 Mark Twain

References

External links

"The Staff Breakup of McClure's Magazine"
Advertisements in McClure's Magazine 1920s
McClure's Magazine at Project Gutenberg, filed under Various (plain text and HTML)
McClure's Magazine at Internet Archive, misc. volumes (scanned books original editions color illustrated)
McClure's Magazine at Hathi Trust, misc. volumes (scanned books original editions)
McClure's Magazine at Google Books, misc. volumes (scanned books original editions)
McClure's Magazine at The Modernist Journals Project: 117 cover-to-cover, searchable issues from February 1900 (issue 14.2) through December 1910 (issue 36.2) that include original wrappers, contents pages, and advertising. PDFs of these issues may be downloaded for free from the MJP website.

 
Monthly magazines published in the United States
Defunct political magazines published in the United States
Defunct literary magazines published in the United States
Magazines established in 1893
Magazines disestablished in 1929
Magazines published in New York City
Progressive Era in the United States